Kelly Chal is a former New Zealand politician. She was elected to parliament as a member of the United Future party and held her seat for 17 days before it was realised she was ineligible, not being a New Zealand citizen.

Early life
Chal was born in India to a Sikh father and a Christian mother. She herself is Christian. Te Ara - The Encyclopedia of New Zealand describes her as "an Indian-born Englishwoman who had not taken out New Zealand citizenship."  In New Zealand, she worked as a case manager for the  Accident Compensation Corporation and as a career counsellor.

Member of Parliament

In the 2002 election the United Future party ranked Chal fifth on its party list, and therefore she was expected to enter parliament. After the election, however, it emerged that Chal could not legally stand for election, as she lacked New Zealand citizenship. As a result, she was removed from the party list, allowing Paul Adams to enter parliament in her place. 

It was suggested that legal action might be taken against Chal, as she had signed a declaration that she was eligible to stand. The authorities eventually decided, however, that Chal had made an honest mistake. Chal did not contest the 2005 election.

References

Living people
Year of birth missing (living people)
United Future politicians
Indian expatriates in New Zealand
21st-century New Zealand women politicians
New Zealand people of Indian descent
Unsuccessful candidates in the 2002 New Zealand general election